Sexual narcissism has been described as an egocentric pattern of sexual behavior that involves an inflated sense of sexual ability and sexual entitlement.  In addition, sexual narcissism is the erotic preoccupation with oneself as a superb lover through a desire to merge sexually with a mirror image of oneself.  Sexual narcissism is an intimacy dysfunction in which sexual exploits are pursued, generally in the form of extramarital affairs, to overcompensate for low self-esteem and an inability to experience true intimacy. This behavioral pattern is believed to be more common in men than in women and has been tied to domestic violence in men and sexual coercion in couples. Hurlbert argues that sex is a natural biological given and therefore cannot be deemed as an addiction.  He and his colleagues assert that any sexual addiction is nothing more than a misnomer for what is actually sexual narcissism or sexual compulsivity.

References

Human sexuality
Narcissism